Companiganj is the name of two Upazilas in Bangladesh:

Companiganj Upazila, Noakhali
Companiganj Upazila, Sylhet